Joseph Lyman (September 13, 1840 – July 9, 1890) was a Civil War  soldier, lawyer, and judge. In the 1880s, he was a two-term Republican U.S. Representative from Iowa's 9th congressional district in southwestern Iowa.

Biography 
Lyman was born in Lyons, Michigan, in Ionia County. After he attended the common schools in Ohio, he moved to Big Grove  (later named Oakland), Iowa, in 1857.  He then attended Iowa College (later named Grinnell College), in Grinnell, Iowa.

After the outbreak of the Civil War in 1861, Lyman enlisted in the Union Army. He initially served in Company E of the 4th Regiment Iowa Volunteer Cavalry. He later served as an adjutant of the 29th Iowa Volunteer Infantry Regiment, from October 19, 1862, to February 21, 1865, including service during 1864 as aide de camp and Inspector General on the staff of Brig. Gen. Samuel Allen Rice.  He was a major of the same regiment and aide de camp and acting assistant adjutant general on the staff of Maj. Gen. Frederick Steele from February 21, 1865, to August 10, 1865.

After the war, he studied law, was admitted to the bar in 1866, and commenced practice in Council Bluffs, Iowa. He initially served as deputy collector of internal revenue of the fifth district of Iowa, from 1867 to 1870.  Later in his legal career, he became a judge of the circuit court in 1884.

In 1884, he was elected as a Republican to the United States House of Representatives from Iowa's 9th congressional district, and served in the Forty-ninth U.S. Congress. Two years later, he was re-elected to a second term (in the Fiftieth U.S. Congress).  However, he declined to be a candidate for renomination in 1888.  In all, he served in Congress from March 4, 1885 to March 3, 1889.

Lyman resumed the practice of law in Council Bluffs, where he died of paralysis, after a long period of sickness.  He was interred in Fairview Cemetery.

References

 Retrieved on 2009-04-20

External links

1840 births
1890 deaths
People from Ionia County, Michigan
Politicians from Council Bluffs, Iowa
Union Army officers
Iowa lawyers
Iowa state court judges
Republican Party members of the United States House of Representatives from Iowa
19th-century American politicians
19th-century American judges
19th-century American lawyers
Military personnel from Michigan
Military personnel from Iowa
Grinnell College alumni